Auletta is an indie rock band from Mainz, Germany. The band named itself after the town Auletta in Italy, where they went on holiday in 2006.

History 
The band was founded in 2005. In 2007 the band got their break by performing at the Emergenza European festival and later that same year they won the 'Rockbuster' competition.  The following year, they appeared with Art Brut and Kilians. At the end of 2008, Auletta signed a record deal with EMI. On 26 June 2009, the band released their first album "Pöbelei & Poesie" (literally translated as Vulgarity and poetry). "Meine Stadt" (My Town), one of the songs on the album, was included in EA Sports video game, FIFA 10. On 1 October 2010, the band represented Rheinland-Pfalz at the Bundesvision Song Contest 2010 and finished 14th place out of 16 performing "Sommerdiebe" (Summer thieves).

Discography

References

External links 
  (in German)
 Auletta profile on Laut.de (in German)
 

German indie rock groups
Participants in the Bundesvision Song Contest
EMI Group artists